Adderley v. Florida, 385 U.S. 39 (1966), was a United States Supreme Court case regarding whether arrests for protesting in front of a jail were constitutional.

Background information
In 1966, a group of students from Florida A&M University demonstrated against racial segregation, and were subsequently arrested. The day after, around 200 FAMU students gathered in front of the Leon County jail to protest their arrest.

Petitioners, 32 students, were members of a group of about 200 who on a nonpublic jail driveway, which they blocked, and on adjacent county jail premises had, by singing, clapping, and dancing, demonstrated against their schoolmates' arrest and perhaps against segregation in the jail and elsewhere. The sheriff, the jail's custodian, advised them that they were trespassing on county property and would have to leave or be arrested. The 107 demonstrators refusing to depart were thereafter arrested and convicted under a Florida trespass statute for "trespass with a malicious and mischievous intent." Petitioners contend that their convictions, affirmed by the Florida Circuit Court and the District Court of Appeal, deprived them of their "rights of free speech, assembly, petition, due process of law and equal protection of the laws" under the Fourteenth Amendment.

Decision
The U.S. Supreme Court upheld the trespassing conviction in a 5–4 decision. The majority opinion, authored by Justice Black, argued that county jails were not public places and so it did not infringe on their right to assembly. The decision argued that states may protect their property and withhold its use from demonstrators for nondiscriminatory reasons such as protection from damage.

Dissenting opinion
Justice Douglas authored a dissenting opinion in which Chief Justice Warren and Justices Brennan and Fortas concurred. Douglas argued that the protesters did not engage in or threaten violence or block the entrance of the jail.  Public officials should not, according to this vision of the First Amendment, be given discretion to decide which public places can be used for the expression of ideas.

See also
 List of United States Supreme Court cases, volume 385
 List of United States Supreme Court cases by the Warren Court
Free speech zone
Brown v. Louisiana
Cox v. Louisiana
Edwards v. South Carolina

References

External links

 Case brief: Quimbee

1966 in United States case law
Civil rights movement case law
Freedom of assembly
United States Free Speech Clause case law
United States Supreme Court cases
United States Supreme Court cases of the Warren Court
Void for vagueness case law